is a Japanese professional shogi player ranked 7-dan.

Promotion history
Murooka's promotion history is as follows:

 1973: 6-kyū
 1977: 1-dan
 1981, December 16: 4-dan
 1985, April 1: 5-dan
 1989, May 22: 6-dan
 1997, May 30: 7-dan

References

External links
 ShogiHub: Murooka, Katsuhiko
 Blog: 室岡克彦７段の荒川将棋日記 
  

Japanese shogi players
Living people
Professional shogi players
Professional shogi players from Tokyo
People from Arakawa, Tokyo
1959 births